Al-Fadl ibn Shavur or Fadl II was the ninth ruler of the Shaddadids, from 1067 to 1073.  He was the son and successor of Abu'l-Aswar Shavur ibn Fadl.

Sources
 

Emirs of Ganja
Kurdish rulers
11th-century rulers in Asia
11th-century Kurdish people